Gustavo Ernesto Huerta Araya (born 15 October 1957) is a Chilean former footballer and manager. He is currently the head coach of Cobresal.

Managerial career
Before the 1998 FIFA World Cup, Huerta was the assistant of the Head Coach of Chile, Nelson Acosta. He managed Chile B in a friendly match against England B on February 10, 1998. Chile won by 2–1.

Personal life
Both his father, Gustavo Sr.,  and his younger brothers, Fernando and Carlos, were professional footballers. All of them played for Deportes Ovalle among other clubs. Also, his son Gustavo is a sport journalist who has worked for Televisión Nacional de Chile and ESPN Chile.

Honours

Player
Cobresal
 Copa Chile: 1987

References

External links

1957 births
Living people
People from Ovalle
Chilean footballers
Chile international footballers
Chilean Primera División players
Primera B de Chile players
Deportes Ovalle footballers
Ferroviarios footballers
C.D. Antofagasta footballers
Cobresal footballers
Association football midfielders
Chilean football managers
Chilean Primera División managers
Primera B de Chile managers
Bolivian Primera División managers
Cobresal managers
Deportes La Serena managers
Chile national football team managers
Club Bolívar managers
Universidad de Chile managers
Cobreloa managers
Santiago Wanderers managers
Coquimbo Unido managers
Deportes Iquique managers
Deportes Antofagasta managers
Chilean expatriate sportspeople in Bolivia
Expatriate football managers in Bolivia